Leslie Herbert Arthur Jeffers (8 January 1910 – 4 May 2000) was an English freestyle sport wrestler who competed for Great Britain in the 1936 Summer Olympics.

He was born in Plaistow, West Sussex and died in Middlesbrough.

In 1936 he competed in the freestyle middleweight tournament.

At the 1938 Empire Games he won the bronze medal in the freestyle middleweight class.

During his time as a wrestler, Leslie stood 10 feet from Adolf Hitler and in his words, "If I knew what that SOB was going to do, I would've gladly given my life and killed him right there on the spot."

Leslie (also known as Jeff to his friends) also worked with Scotland yard.  During his time there, he unknowingly captured a serial killer.  Leslie one night arrested a man and prepared to bring him in for questioning.  The man started crying and asked to reach into his pocket for a handkerchief.  Leslie told the man to wait until they returned to the station and brought him in.  It was found out later that the pocket did not contain a handkerchief.  Rather, there was a straight razor the man intended to use on Leslie to get away.

(Both stories that have been added will be extremely difficult to verify.  They are both personal stories told to me by Jeff back in the mid 1980s)

External links

References

1910 births
2000 deaths
People from Chichester District
Olympic wrestlers of Great Britain
Wrestlers at the 1936 Summer Olympics
British male sport wrestlers
Wrestlers at the 1938 British Empire Games
Commonwealth Games bronze medallists for England
Commonwealth Games medallists in wrestling
Medallists at the 1938 British Empire Games